Vanity height is defined by the Council on Tall Buildings and Urban Habitat (CTBUH) as the height difference between a skyscraper's pinnacle and the highest usable floor (usually observatory, office, restaurant, retail or hotel/residential). Because the CTBUH ranks the world's tallest buildings by height to pinnacle, a number of buildings appear higher in the rankings than they otherwise would due to extremely long spires.

The controversy began when the Petronas Towers were named as the world's tallest buildings in 1998, despite having a roof 63.4 m (208 ft) lower than that of the Willis Tower. The current world's tallest building, Burj Khalifa, is officially 828 meters tall, but its highest usable floor is 585m above ground. Therefore, its vanity height is defined as 244 meters, or 29% of the building's total height.
Without this vanity height the Burj Khalifa would still be the tallest building in the world, but only by 2 meters.

The next potential tallest building, the Jeddah Tower, could be over 1,000 meters tall but its highest floor is planned to be 630m above ground. The top 370m (equivalent to an 85-story building) or 37% of the building's total height will be unusable. When vanity height is excluded, the height progression of the world's tallest buildings looks much more modest in comparison.

The CTBUH requires a structure's vanity height to be under 50% to be defined as a "building." Otherwise, it is considered a communications tower and ineligible for the rankings.

See also
 List of tallest buildings

References

Skyscrapers
Architectural design